Kingsmills Park was a football ground in Inverness, Scotland. It was the home ground of Inverness Thistle F.C.

Following the merger of Inverness Thistle with Caledonian F.C. in 1994, the new team played at Caledonian's ground, Telford Street Park. In 1996 the club moved to the newly built Caledonian Stadium. A care home currently sits upon the location of the former ground.

References

Defunct football venues in Scotland
Sports venues in Inverness
Sports venues completed in 1895
Sports venues demolished in 1994
Demolished sports venues in the United Kingdom